The 2005 CAR Development Trophy is the second edition of second level rugby union tournament in Africa. The competition involved nine teams that were divided into two zones (North and South). The winner of the two zone were admitted to final

North Zone

Preliminary

Semifinals

3rd place final

1st place final

South Zone 

 Mauritius won the pool

Final 

2005
2005 rugby union tournaments for national teams
2005 in African rugby union